Eudyptes is a genus of penguins whose members are collectively called crested penguins. The exact number of species in the genus varies between four and seven depending on the authority, and a Chatham Islands species became extinct in recent centuries. All are black and white penguins with yellow crests, red bills and eyes, and are found on Subantarctic islands in the world's southern oceans. All lay two eggs, but raise only one young per breeding season; the first egg laid is substantially smaller than the second.

Taxonomy
The genus Eudyptes was introduced by the French ornithologist Louis Jean Pierre Vieillot in 1816; the name is derived from the Ancient Greek words eu meaning "fine", and dyptes meaning "diver". The type species was designated as the southern rockhopper penguin by George Robert Gray in 1840.

Six extant species have been classically recognised, with the recent splitting of the rockhopper penguin increasing it to seven. Conversely, the close relationship of the macaroni and royal penguins, and the erect-crested and Snares penguins have led some to propose that the two pairs should be regarded as species.

Order Sphenisciformes
 Family Spheniscidae
 Fiordland penguin, Eudyptes pachyrhynchus
 Snares penguin, Eudyptes robustus – has been considered a subspecies of the Fiordland penguin
 Erect-crested penguin, Eudyptes sclateri
 Southern rockhopper penguin, Eudyptes chrysocome
 Eastern rockhopper penguin, Eudyptes (chrysocome) filholi
 Western rockhopper penguin, Eudyptes (chrysocome) chrysocome
 Northern rockhopper penguin, Eudyptes moseleyi – traditionally considered a subspecies of Eudyptes chrysocome as the rockhopper penguin.
 Royal penguin, Eudyptes schlegeli – sometimes considered a morph of E. chrysolophus
 Macaroni penguin, Eudyptes chrysolophus
 Chatham penguin, Eudyptes warhami (extinct)
The Chatham Islands Eudyptes warhami is known only from subfossil bones, and became extinct shortly following human colonisation of the Chatham Islands. This genetically-distinct species was relatively large, with a thin, slim and low bill. (T.L. Cole et al. (2019) Mol. Biol. Evol.)

Evolution

Mitochondrial and nuclear DNA evidence suggests that the crested penguins split from the ancestors of their closest living relative, the yellow-eyed penguin, in the mid-Miocene around 15 million years ago, before splitting into separate species around 8 million years ago in the late Miocene.

A fossil penguin genus, Madrynornis, has been identified as the closest known relative of the crested penguins. Found in late Miocene deposits dated to about 10 million years ago, it must have separated from the crested penguins around 12 million years ago. Given that the head ornamentation by yellow filoplumes seems plesiomorphic for the Eudyptes-Megadyptes lineage, Madrynornis probably had them too.

Description
The crested penguins are all similar in appearance, having sharply delineated black and white plumage with red beaks and prominent yellow crests. Their calls are more complex than those of other species, with several phrases of differing lengths. The royal penguin (mostly) has a white face, while other species have black faces.

Breeding
Crested penguins breed on Subantarctic islands in the southern reaches of the world's oceans; the greatest diversity occurring around New Zealand and surrounding islands. Their breeding displays and behaviours are generally more complex than other penguin species. Both male and female parents take shifts incubating eggs and young.

Crested penguins lay two eggs, but almost always raise only one young successfully. All species exhibit the odd phenomenon of egg-size dimorphism in breeding; the first egg (or A-egg) laid is substantially smaller than the second egg (B-egg). This is most extreme in the macaroni penguin, where the first egg averages only 60% the size of the second. The reason for this is a mystery remains unknown, although several theories have been proposed. British ornithologist David Lack theorized that the genus was evolving toward the laying of a one-egg clutch. Experiments with egg substitution have shown that A-eggs can produce viable chicks that were only 7% lighter at time of fledging.  Physiologically, the first egg is smaller because it develops while the mother is still at sea swimming and thus has less energy to invest in the egg.

Recently, brooding royal and erect-crested penguins have been reported to tip the smaller eggs out as the second is laid.

Species photographs
Photographs of adults of the extant (living) species are shown:

References

Cited text
 
 Cole, Theresa L.; Ksepka, Daniel T.; Mitchell, Kieren J.; Tennyson, Alan J. D.; Thomas, Daniel B.; Pan, Hailin; Zhang, Guojie; Rawlence, Nicolas J.; Wood, Jamie R.; Bover, Pere; Bouzat, Juan L.; Cooper, Alan; Fiddamanl, Steven; Hart, Tom; Miller, Gary; Ryan, Peter G.; Shepherd, Lara D.; Wilmshurst, Janet M.; Waters, Jonathan M. (2019). "Mitogenomes uncover extinct penguin taxa and reveal island formation as a key driver of speciation". Molecular Biology and Evolution. doi:10.1093/molbev/msz017.

External links
  TerraNature.org: "Three Eudyptes species endemic to New Zealand"

.
Penguins
Spheniscidae
Taxa named by Louis Jean Pierre Vieillot